This is a list of the 71 Members of Parliament (MPs) elected to the House of Commons of the United Kingdom by Scottish constituencies for the Forty-third parliament of the United Kingdom (1964–1966) at the 1964 United Kingdom general election.

Composition

Members

See also 

 Lists of MPs for constituencies in Scotland

Lists of MPs for constituencies in Scotland
1964 United Kingdom general election